Scorpaenopsis cirrosa, the weedy stingfish, is a species of venomous marine ray-finned fish belonging to the family Scorpaenidae, the scorpionfishes. This species is found in the Northwest Pacific Ocean. From southern Japan and in China south to Hong Kong and northern Taiwan.

Size

References

cirrosa
Taxa named by Carl Peter Thunberg
Fish described in 1793